Francisco "Kiko" Galván Fernández (born 1 December 1997) is a Spanish cyclist, who currently rides for UCI ProTeam .

Major results
2019
 1st Overall Vuelta a Cantabria
1st Stage 1
2020
 9th Overall Tour du Limousin
2021
 4th Grand Prix La Marseillaise
 4th Overall Volta ao Alentejo
2022
 3rd Grand Prix La Marseillaise
 9th Clàssica Comunitat Valenciana 1969

Grand Tour general classification results timeline

References

External links

1997 births
Living people
Spanish male cyclists
Cyclists from Catalonia
People from Vallès Oriental
Sportspeople from the Province of Barcelona
21st-century Spanish people